Mr. Potato Head Saves Veggie Valley is a PC CD-ROM game. Mr. Potato Head and Sweet Potato must work together to save Veggie Valley from a drought. It was later released as part of Mac Kids Pack.

Plot
After seeing that their baby spuds need water, Mr. Potato Head and his daughter Sweet Potato set out to bring a grumpy storm cloud to Veggie Valley so they can water their spuds. The cloud is revealed to be above a carnival, so they use prizes that they win in playable mini-games to help them with their adventure. After helping and trading certain prizes with many vegetables, they use a plane ride to lasso the storm cloud and bring it to Veggie Valley. Once there, however, the storm cloud can only start to rain if he laughs, so Mr. Potato Head and Sweet Potato dress up in silly outfits and make him laugh. The storm cloud starts to rain and the baby spuds sprout.

References

1995 video games
Adventure games
Apple Bandai Pippin games
Classic Mac OS games
Veggie Valley
Puzzle video games
Video games about food and drink
Video games developed in the United States
Windows games
Children's educational video games